Alkuti is a village near the western border in Parner taluka of Ahmednagar district in the Indian state of Maharashtra. Famous for its wildlife, mainly sambar and deer. A wide variety of butterflies will be seen here from July to December. It is a tourist destination, and deer and sambars, roaming freely, can be seen up close.

Geography
The village is located on intersection of Shirur–Alephata (State Highway 51). Alukti is 10 km away from Belhe, a village on National Highway 61 (NH 61) Kalyan–Nirmal. Alkuti is also located on NH 761. The nearest railway station is Ahmednagar, 70Km away from Alukti.

The population of Alkuti is 4850 (2011). Alkuti is also known for Kadam-Bande Wada. It is a great fort located on ground in the centre of village; which is still owned by the descendants of the Kadambande family.

Education

Educational facilities from Primary to up to Graduation are available in Alkuti. Masters & Ph.D available in Ahmednagar & Pune.

Schools & Colleges
 Jilha Parishad Primary School, Alkuti
 Jilha Parishad Primary School, (Bahirobawadi) Alkuti
 Rayat Kshishan Sanstha's Shri SAINATH Highschool and Junior College (Science, Arts and MCVC) Alkuti.
 SAI Education Socity's English Medium School Alkuti
 Ashram Shala Alkuti
 Art, Commerce & Science Senior College, Alkuti

Transport 
The village located on State Highway SH 53 Alephata - Shirur. Kalyan - Nirmal National Highway 61 is 10 Km away from Alkuti. Pune - Nashik National Highway 50 Old is 22 Km away. The Belha - Jejuri Highway is 10 Km away from Alkuti. The nearest Railway Station is Ahmednagar, 70 Km away from Alkuti.

Transport facilities like MSRTC buses, Private Buses, Four wheelers are also available in the village.

Villages in Parner taluka
Villages in Ahmednagar district